Augouardia is a genus of flowering plants in the legume family, Fabaceae. It belongs to the subfamily Detarioideae.

The genus has only one species, Augouardia letestui, which is endemic to Gabon, Africa.

References

Detarioideae
Monotypic Fabaceae genera
Taxa named by François Pellegrin